Peripolocetus is a genus of balaenid baleen whale from the middle Miocene of Kern County, California.

Classification

Like other non-balaenopteroid thalassotheres, Peripolocetus was classified as a cetotheriid in the past. When named by American zoologist Remington Kellogg in 1931, it was assigned to Cetotheriidae, an opinion followed by subsequent authors. However, it was assigned to Mysticeti incertae sedis by one source, and a cladistic analysis of Herpetocetus morrowi recovered Peripolocetus as a member of Balaenoidea. The assignment of Peripolocetus to Balaenoidea was further reinforced by a new specimen from the type locality at Sharktooth Hill Bonebed.

References 

Baleen whales
Miocene cetaceans
Prehistoric cetacean genera
Fossil taxa described in 1931
Fossils of the United States
Taxa named by Remington Kellogg